God be with you is a parting phrase. It may also refer to:

Music
 A song on the Cranberries album To the Faithful Departed
 A song on the Rock Goddess album Hell Hath No Fury

Parting phrases